Steven Harris (born August 14, 1984) is a former American college and professional football player who was a defensive tackle in the National Football League (NFL) for a single season in 2007.  Harris played college football for the University of Florida, and was a member of a BCS National Championship team.  Thereafter, he played professionally for the Denver Broncos of the NFL.

Early years 

Harris was born in Homestead, Florida in 1984.  He attended Coral Gables Senior High School in Coral Gables, Florida, where he played high school football for the Coral Gables Cavaliers.

College career 
Harris accepted an athletic scholarship to attend the University of Florida in Gainesville, Florida, where he was a defensive lineman for coach Ron Zook and coach Urban Meyer's Florida Gators football teams from 2003 to 2006.  He was a starting defensive tackle for the 2006 Gators team that defeated the Ohio State Buckeyes, 41–14, in the 2007 BCS National Championship Game.  As a senior in 2006, Harris was the recipient of the Gators' James W. Kynes Award, recognizing the lineman who "best exemplified mental and physical toughness and iron-man determination."

Professional career 

On August 31, 2008, Harris was signed to the Broncos practice squad; he was released on October 21 to make room for running back P. J. Pope.

See also 

 History of the Denver Broncos
 List of Florida Gators in the NFL Draft

References

Bibliography 

 Carlson, Norm, University of Florida Football Vault: The History of the Florida Gators, Whitman Publishing, LLC, Atlanta, Georgia (2007).  .

External links 
  Steven Harris – Florida Gators player profile

1984 births
Living people
People from Homestead, Florida
Sportspeople from Coral Gables, Florida
Players of American football from Florida
American football defensive tackles
Florida Gators football players
Denver Broncos players